Afzelia quanzensis (pod mahogany) is a protected tree in South Africa.

Description 
This deciduous tree can grow up to 20m in height, and has smooth, grey bark, which can flake in irregular patches. It has glossy dark green leaves and blooms between October and November. The flowers have one large red petal. After flowering, it produces a seed capsule, a thick wood-like pod, which contains black seeds with a hard, bright red aril covering one end.

Uses 
The seeds are sometimes made into native necklaces and the timber is an ornamental and lumber hardwood, used in furniture, parquet flooring and railway sleepers.

This plant may be used in traditional medicine.

See also
List of Southern African indigenous trees

References

External links
 

quanzensis
Flora of Southern Africa
Trees of Africa
Protected trees of South Africa
Northern Zanzibar–Inhambane coastal forest mosaic